Michael Chapman or Mike Chapman may refer to:
 Mike Chapman (born 1947), Australian record producer and songwriter
 Michael Chapman (bassoonist) (1934–2005), British classical bassoonist and reed-maker
 Michael Chapman (cinematographer) (1935–2020), American cinematographer
Mike Chapman (politician) (born 1963), member of the Washington State House of Representatives
 Michael Chapman (singer) (1941–2021), English singer-songwriter and guitarist
 Michael Chapman (lawyer), American lawyer
 Michael Chapman (Missouri politician), Director of Homeland Security for the State of Missouri
 Mike Chapman (cartoonist) (born 1973), American animator, part of The Brothers Chaps
 Michael Chapman (Australian politician) (1822–1906), member of the New South Wales Legislative Assembly
 Michael Chapman (priest) (1939–2019), Archdeacon of Northampton
 Michael L. Chapman (born 1957), American law enforcement executive